Linlithgow may mean or refer to:
 
 Linlithgow, Scotland
 the Linlithgow constituency of the Scottish Parliament 
 the historic Linlithgow constituency of the Parliament of the United Kingdom
 John Hope, 7th Earl of Hopetoun, first Governor-General of Australia, later 1st Marquess of Linlithgow
 Victor Hope, 2nd Marquess of Linlithgow, Governor-General and Viceroy of India 1936–43